This article contains information about the literary events and publications of 1724.

Events
January – Andrew Michael Ramsay goes to Rome to tutor the two sons of James Francis Edward Stuart, Jacobite pretender to the British throne.
August – Thomas Longman establishes the Longman publishing house in London.
November 16 – An "autobiographical" Narrative of the life of notorious criminal Jack Sheppard, said to be by Daniel Defoe, goes on sale at Sheppard's execution at Tyburn.

New books

Prose
Anonymous (attributed to Daniel Defoe) – A Narrative of All the Robberies, Escapes, &c. of John Sheppard
Gilbert Burnet (died 1715) – Bishop Burnet's History of His Own Time, Vol. I
Samuel Clarke – Sermons of Samuel Clarke
Anthony Collins – Discourse of the Grounds and Reasons of the Christian Religion with An Apology for Free Debate and Liberty of Writing
Mary Davys – The Reform'd Coquet (novella)
Daniel Defoe
Roxana: The Fortunate Mistress
A New Voyage Round the World
A Tour thro' the Whole Island of Great Britain
John Dennis – Vice and Luxury Publick Mischiefs (on Mandeville)
Richard Fiddes
A General Treatise of Morality (on Mandeville)
The Life of Cardinal Wolsey
Eliza Haywood
La Belle Assemblé
The Fatal Secret (fiction)
Lasselia
The Masqueraders
Thomas Hearne, ed. – Robert of Gloucester's Chronicle
Edward Hyde, 1st Earl of Clarendon (died 1674) – An Appendix to the History of the Grand Rebellion
Captain Charles Johnson (attributed to Daniel Defoe or Nathaniel Mist) – A General History of the Pyrates
William Law – Remarks Upon a Late Book (against Mandeville)
John Oldmixon – The Critical History of England, Ecclesiastical and Civil
Paul de Rapin – L'Histoire d'Angleterre
Jonathan Swift
A Letter to the Shop-keepers... of Ireland (as M. B. Drapier)
A Letter to Mr. Harding the Printer (as Drapier)
Some Observations Upon a Paper Relating to Wood's Half-pence (as Drapier)
A Letter to the Whole People of Ireland (Drapier)
A Letter to the Right Honourable the Lord Viscount Molesworth (last of the Drapier letters)
Seasonable Advice
Isaac Watts – Logic, or The Right Use of Reason in the Enquiry After Truth With a Variety of Rules to Guard Against Error in the Affairs of Religion and Human Life, as well as in the Sciences

Drama
Colley Cibber – Caesar in Egypt
John Gay – The Captives
Ludvig Holberg – Henrich og Pernille (Henrik and Pernille)
 Robert Hurst – The Roman Maid
George Jeffreys – Edwin
Pierre de Marivaux – La Fausse Suivante
 William Phillips – Belisarius
John Rich – The Necromancer; or, History of Dr. Faustus

Poetry
Matthew Concanen – Miscellaneous Poems
Eliza Haywood – Poems on Several Occasions
Allan Ramsay
The Ever Green: Being a collection of Scots Poems
Health
Elizabeth Tollet – Poems on Several Occasions
Voltaire – La Henriade
Leonard Welsted – Epistles, Odes, &c.
See also 1724 in poetry

Births
January 12 – Frances Brooke, English novelist and dramatist (died 1789)
March 20 – Duncan Ban MacIntyre, Scottish Gaelic poet (died 1812)
April 22 – Immanuel Kant German philosopher (died 1804)
June 4 – William Gilpin, English writer, painter and originator of "picturesque" (died 1804)
July 2 – Friedrich Gottlieb Klopstock, German poet (died 1803)
July 26 – Ji Yun (纪昀), Chinese poet and scholar (died 1805)
July 31 – Noël François de Wailly, French grammarian and lexicographer (died 1801)
October 31 – Christopher Anstey, English writer and poet (died 1805)
December 13 – Franz Aepinus, German natural philosopher (died 1802)
Unknown dates
Samuel Derrick, Irish writer (died 1769)
Frances Sheridan (Frances Chamberlaine), Irish novelist and dramatist (died 1766)

Deaths
January 1 – Charles Gildon, English critic and dramatist (born c. 1665)
January 15 – George Wheler, English travel writer (born 1651)
February 5 – Mary Cowper, English diarist (born 1685)
February 12 – Elkanah Settle, English poet and dramatist (born 1648)
March 19 – Johann Christian Thomae, German historian and biographer (born 1668)
July 11 – Delarivier Manley, writer, playwright and pamphleteer (born c. 1663)
August 15 – Manko, Japanese poet (year of birth not known)
October 6 – Charles Rivière Dufresny, French dramatist (born 1648)
October 29 – William Wollaston, English philosophical writer (born 1659)
November 29 – Laurence Braddon, English writer and politician (year of birth not known)
November – Liam an Dúna Mac Cairteáin, Irish poet and soldier (b. 1668)
probable – Proinsias Ó Doibhlin, Irish poet and priest (year of birth not known)

References

 
Years of the 18th century in literature